Route 106 is a state highway in southwestern Connecticut, running from Stamford to Wilton.

Route description
Route 106 begins at a junction with I-95 (exit 9) and US 1 in the East Side of Stamford as Courtland Avenue then turning right on Glenbrook Road. It runs parallel to the New Canaan Line of the Metro-North Railroad, heading northeast through the northwest edge of Darien into the center of New Canaan. In Darien, the road is known as Hoyt Street. Upon entering the town of New Canaan, the road changes name to Old Stamford Road, where it has an interchange with the Merritt Parkway (at exit 36) as it heads into downtown New Canaan where it becomes Bank Street. It then continues north, briefly overlapping Route 124 for  then heads eastward as East Avenue and Silvermine Road into the town of Wilton. In Wilton, the road is known as New Canaan Road and Wolfpit Road. Route 106 crosses the Norwalk River as well as the railroad tracks of the Danbury Branch then briefly overlaps U.S. Route 7 and Route 33 (0.18 miles) in downtown Wilton, then resumes its eastward journey along Sharp Hill Road then south along Chestnut Hill Road until its end at an intersection with Route 53.

History
Route 106 was established as a result of the 1962 Route Reclassification Act from previously unsigned state-maintained roads. Middlesex Road, Hoyt Street, Old Stamford Road, and Park Street in Darien and New Canaan was taken over by the state in 1962 as SR 749. The following year, SR 749 was redesignated as part of Route 106. North of New Canaan, other former unsigned state roads (SR 403 and SR 414) were incorporated into the newly established Route 106. The route was extended to US 1 in Stamford in 1972. In 1998, the section in Wilton was moved from Belden Hill Road to Wolf Pit Road. Prior to the designation of modern Route 106, an older Route 106 along Center Road in Easton existed between 1935 and 1962. It connected Routes 58 and 59 via Easton Center.

Major intersections

References

106
Transportation in Fairfield County, Connecticut
Transportation in Stamford, Connecticut
New Canaan, Connecticut
Wilton, Connecticut